The Officers' Association (OA) is a British charity supporting military ex-officers and their families, founded in 1920.  It received a Royal Charter on 10 June the following year and is closely associated with The Royal British Legion.

History 
The Officers' Association has a history of supporting officers and their dependents. It has historically helped to address issues with officers finding employment and establishing financial stability and providing advice. For years, it ran a residential home called Huntly; however, in 2011, the residential home closed due to changing residential care requirements.

References

External links
 

Charities based in the United Kingdom
1920 establishments in the United Kingdom